Darbar (pronounced darbār) is a ragam in Carnatic music. The raga is a comparatively recent entry to Carnatic Music, possibly in the earlier part of the 18th century.

Structure and lakshana 
It is a Vakra ragam derived from the 22nd Melakarta rāgam Kharaharapriya. Nishadham and ghandharam used as long in the Avarohana. Its  structure is as follows (see swaras in Carnatic music for details on below notation and terms):

 : 
 : 

The notes used are shadjam, chathusruthi rishabham, sadharana gandharam, shuddha madhyamam, panchamam, chathusruthi dhaivatham, kaisiki nishadham.

Popular compositions 
Darbar is a scale that is used for compositions in a medium to fast tempo. This scale has been used by many composers and there are many compositions in classical music. It has been used to score film music, too. Here are some popular compositions in Darbar.

 Chalamela, an Adi tala varnam, and Ne vedhikkani by Veena Kuppayyar
 Thyagarajadhanyam and Halasyanadham bhajami by Muthuswami Dikshitar

Thyagaraja 
 Aparathamulaman piyadukovayya – Jhampa
 Yocana Kamalalochana – Adi
 Enthundi Vedalithivo – Triputa
 Ela Theliyalero – Triputa
 Naradhaguruswami Ikanaina – Adi
 Mundhuvenuka Niruprakkalathodai – Adi
 Ramabhirama Ramaneeyarama – Triputa
 Nithyaroopa Evaripandithyamemi – Roopaka
 Paripalayamam Kodantapanaii – Triputa
 Ramalobhamela Nanurakshimchu – Adi

Other compositions 
 Smaramanasa pathmanabacharanam – Roopaka by Swathi Thirunal Rama Varma
 Adiya Patham – Adi by Gopalakrishna Bharathi
 Raghavendra guru manatosmi – Kanta jadi triputa by Mysore Vasudevachar
 Sree Venugopala by Koteeswara Iyer
 Dhaari Theliyaka – Ata tala varnam by Patnam Subramania Iyer
 Meena Nayanana Neevunamidha – Rupaka by Subbaraya Sastri
 Nayaganai nindra – Thiruppavai No. 16 – by Andal
 Vezha Mugatharase by Ambujam Krishna

Related ragams 
Darbar resembles Nayaki.

See also 

 List of film songs based on ragas

Notes

References

Sources

External links 
 Information from Ragasurabhi
 Information from Raaga.Org 

Hindustani ragas
Janya ragas